Topaz is a bookmaker in Azerbaijan, a commercial trademark of Caspiantech, was launched in 2011 as a single legal sports-betting game operator in Azerbaijan.

Caspiantech CJSC was founded on January 19, 2010 with the goal of evaluating the investment potential of Azerbaijan in the sports-betting sector.

In 2013, it launched its greyhound racing game, in addition to commencing the selling of Azerlotereya's lottery products. Topaz was the main sponsor of the Azerbaijan Premier League from 2012-2019.

Sponsorship 
In 2012, Topaz became the official betting partner of Azerbaijan Premier League and received the rights to operate betting for all England and Football Association matches. Topaz was the main sponsor of the Azerbaijan Premier League (Topaz Premiere League) from 2012-2019.

Criticism 
In March 2013, the company faced heavy pressure from the National Assembly of Azerbaijan due its negative effect on youth but the company was supported by Azad Rahimov, the Minister of Youth and Sports of Azerbaijan Republic. Rahimov claimed, all Topaz' operations are fully transparent, and the company is supporting the sport industry.

References

External links

Bookmakers
Companies based in Baku
Azerbaijani companies established in 2011